The Men's two-man bobsleigh competition at the 2006 Winter Olympics in Turin, Italy was held on 18 and 19 February, at Cesana Pariol.

Records
While the IOC does not consider bobsled times eligible for Olympic records, the FIBT does maintain records for both the start and a complete run at each track it competes.

Prior to this competition, the existing Cesana Pariol track records were as follows.

The following track records were established during this event.

The Russian team of Zubkov and Voevoda equalled the track record set just two sleds earlier by Annen and Hefti, but this tie was short-lived; Lange and Kuske, the next team down, broke it by 0.26 seconds.

Results

Each of the 29 two-man teams entered for the event completed the first three runs, and the top 20 qualified for the final run. The total time for all four runs was used to determine the final ranking.

References

Bobsleigh at the 2006 Winter Olympics
Men's bobsleigh at the 2006 Winter Olympics
Men's events at the 2006 Winter Olympics